Neoxolmis is a genus of South American birds in the tyrant flycatcher family Tyrannidae.

Taxonomy
The genus Neoxolmis was introduced in 1927 by the Austrian ornithologist Carl Eduard Hellmayr with the chocolate-vented tyrant as the type species. The genus name combines the Ancient Greek neos meaning "new" with the genus Xolmis that was introduced by Friedrich Boie in 1826. 

This genus formerly contained only the chocolate-vented tyrant. Following the publication of a molecular phylogenetic study in 2020, three species were moved from the genus Xolmis to Neoxolmis.

The genus contains four species:

References

 
Bird genera
Taxonomy articles created by Polbot